The 1998 San Diego State Aztecs football team represented San Diego State University during the 1998 NCAA Division I-A football season as a member of the Western Athletic Conference (WAC). This was the last season for the Aztecs in the WAC, as they became a charter member of the Mountain West Conference in the 1999 season.

The team was led by head coach Ted Tollner, in his fifth year. They played home games at Qualcomm Stadium in San Diego. They completed the season as co-champions of the Pacific Division of the WAC, with a record of seven wins, five losses (7–5, 7–1 WAC). The Aztecs qualified for a bowl game at the end of the 1998 season, and played the North Carolina Tar Heels in the 1998 Las Vegas Bowl in Las Vegas, Nevada.

Schedule

Team players in the NFL
No SDSU players were selected in the 1999 NFL Draft.

The following finished their college career in 1998, were not drafted, but played in the NFL.

Team awards

Notes

References

San Diego State
San Diego State Aztecs football seasons
San Diego State Aztecs football